Anoplophora horsfieldii is a species of beetles in the longhorn beetle family (Cerambycidae).

Subspecies
 Anoplophora horsfieldii horsfieldii (Hope, 1842) 
 Anoplophora horsfieldii tonkinensis (Kriesche, 1924)

Description
Anoplophora horsfieldii can reach a length of about 35 mm. These beetles are black or dark brown, with large irregular pale yellow transversal bands on the elytra, pale yellow markings on the head and the pronotum and very long antennae. Main host plants are Camellia sinensis, Celtis sinensis, Quercus glauca and Ulmus pumila.

Distribution
This species can be found in Thailand, Vietnam, China and Taiwan.

Etymology
The name honours Thomas Horsfield.

References
Lingafelter, S. W. and E. R. Hoebeke. Revision of Anoplophora (Coleoptera: Cerambycidae). The Entomological Society of Washington, Washington, D.C. 2002. 238 p.
 Worldwide Cerambycoidea Photo Gallery
 Biolib

Lamiini
Beetles described in 1842